Ira Nelson Morris (March 8, 1875 – January 15, 1942)  was an American author and diplomat appointed the United States Minister to Sweden, serving from 1914 to 1923. In 1913 he was appointed the Commissioner General to Italy, on behalf of the Panama–Pacific International Exposition.

Early years
Ira Morris was born March 8, 1875, in Chicago, Illinois, to Sarah (née Vogel) and Nelson Morris. His father was a meat-packing executive and founder of Morris & Company.  His brother was Edward Morris. He attended Phillips Academy, in Andover, Massachusetts, graduating in 1892. He then attended Sheffield Scientific School, part of Yale University, graduating in 1895.

Career
After graduation, Morris worked for his father in the meat-packing industry. He became involved in social problems and philanthropy, and was a member of the Chicago Peace Society and a foreign delegate to the American Peace Conference. After leaving his father's company he served as the president of Union Rending Company; treasurer of Consumer's Cotton Oil Company; secretary of Fairbank Canning Company; and director of National Packing Company, the National Stockyards of St. Louis, and A.M. Rothschild and Company.

In 1913, he was appointed the Commissioner General to Italy, where he helped the Italian government gain representation at the Panama–Pacific International Exposition. On July 13, 1914, he was appointed the United States Minister to Sweden, a position he held until April 3, 1923.

Personal life

In 1898, he married Constance Lily Rothschild, daughter of Victor Henry Rothschild, in New York City; they had two children, Constance Irene Morris and author Ira Victor Morris.

In 1921, while sailing to New York, on the Scandinavian-American liner United States, Morris saved the life of 19-year-old Ellen Neilson, of Brooklyn, in mid-ocean, when she was nearly washed overboard.

Morris died in Chicago on January 15, 1942. His will included $150,000 for the construction of a mausoleum at Rosehill Cemetery, where he was interred.

Namesake
The World War II Liberty Ship  was named in his honor.

References

Bibliography 

 

1875 births
1942 deaths
Writers from Chicago
American people of German-Jewish descent
Jewish American writers
Phillips Academy alumni
Yale University alumni
Ambassadors of the United States to Sweden
Morris family (meatpacking)
Burials at Rosehill Cemetery